Tina Dietze (born 25 January 1988) is a German sprint canoer who has competed since the late 2000s. She won the gold medal in K-2 (with Franziska Weber) and the silver medal in K-4 at the 2012 Olympic Games.

Career
She won 14 medals at the ICF Canoe Sprint World Championships with five golds (K-1 4 x 200 m: 2010, K-4 200 m: 2009, K-2 200 m and K-2 500 m: 2013).

In June 2015, she competed in the inaugural European Games, for Germany in canoe sprint, more specifically, in the Women's K-4 500m with Verena Hantl, Franziska Weber, and Conny Wassmuth. She earned a silver medal.

At the 2016 Summer Olympics, she won the silver medal in the women's K-2 500 metres event with teammate Franziska Weber. She also won a silver medal as part of the women's K-4 500 metres team.

References

External links

1988 births
German female canoeists
Living people
Canoeists at the 2012 Summer Olympics
Canoeists at the 2016 Summer Olympics
Canoeists at the 2020 Summer Olympics
Olympic canoeists of Germany
Olympic gold medalists for Germany
Olympic silver medalists for Germany
Olympic medalists in canoeing
ICF Canoe Sprint World Championships medalists in kayak
Medalists at the 2012 Summer Olympics
Medalists at the 2016 Summer Olympics
European Games medalists in canoeing
Canoeists at the 2015 European Games
European Games silver medalists for Germany
Sportspeople from Leipzig
Canoeists at the 2019 European Games